Alyaksandr Halowchyk (born 17 October 1979) is a retired Belarusian professional footballer.

External links
 Profile at teams.by
 

1979 births
Living people
Belarusian footballers
FC Kobrin players
FC Dynamo Brest players
FC Granit Mikashevichi players
Association football defenders